USS LSM(R)–519 was an , a type of amphibious assault ship in the United States Navy. 
 
She was originally projected as LSM-519 and was laid down on 28 April 1945 by the Brown Shipbuilding Co., Inc., in Houston, Texas. She was launched on 2 June 1945 and commissioned on 28 July.

Service history
Following preliminary shakedown off Galveston, Texas,  LSM(R)–519, steamed to Charleston, South Carolina, thence to Little Creek, Virginia, for completion of training. On 23 October she departed Little Creek for Troy, New York, where she conducted Navy Day activities.

By 1 November she was back in the tidewater area and on the 5th she sailed south. She arrived at the St. Johns River Florida  Reserve Berthing Area on 9 November.

In March 1946 she was decommissioned. Renamed the Powder River on 1 October 1955, after the Powder River in Wyoming and Montana. The LSM(R) remained in the Florida Group, Atlantic Reserve Fleet until struck from the Navy List on 1 October 1958.

References

External links 
 Dictionary of American Naval Fighting Ships

Ships built in Houston
World War II amphibious warfare vessels of the United States
LSM(R)-501-class medium landing ships
1945 ships